is a private university in Yahata Higashi, Kitakyushu, Fukuoka, Japan.
The roots of the university can be found in the "Kyushu Law School", which was founded in 1930. The direct predecessor to the school, "Yahata University", was established in 1950, and it adopted the present name in 1989.

History 

1930: Kyushu Law School (established)
1940: Kyushu College (renamed)
1947: Tobata College (renamed)
1949: Yahata College (renamed)
1950: Yahata University (reestablished)
1989: Kyushu International University (renamed)

Faculties 
Law
Economics
International Studies (International Relations)

Graduate Schools 
Law
Business and Environment

External links
Official website 

Educational institutions established in 1950
Private universities and colleges in Japan
Universities and colleges in Fukuoka Prefecture
1950 establishments in Japan